Fencing competitions at the 2016 Pekan Olahraga Nasional were held between 23 September and 28 September at Haris Hotel, Bandung, West Java, Indonesia. A total of 234 athletes competed in 12 events—six individual and six team.

Qualification 
Qualification for 12 competition classes were contested at the Kejuaraan Pra Pon Anggar 2015 which were held from 12 September to 29 September 2015 at Bikasoga Sport Center, Bandung, West Java. 
each province gets a maximum of 24 athlete quota.

Medalists

Men's

Women's

Medal table

References

2016 Pekan Olahraga Nasional
2016 in fencing